Boys Playing on the Shore (also Children Playing on the Shore) is a painting by Finnish painter Albert Edelfelt completed in 1884. 

The painting depicts three boys playing on a shore with a self-made .  

Albert Edelfelt painted the picture in Haikko, Porvoo, Finland from August to October in 1884. The painting was meant to be put on display in Stockholm in 1885, but this did not occur. The painting was bought from Galerie Georges Petit in Paris for 5 000 francs by count Wladimir Scheremetjeff for Empress Dagmar. It was bought in 1930 in Leningrad by art dealer W. Sjöberg from Helsinki and then sold to Ateneum for 85 000 marks. 

The painting is on display at Ateneum in Helsinki, Finland.

Studies

References 

1884 paintings
Paintings by Albert Edelfelt
Paintings in the collection of the Ateneum
Paintings of people